50th Birthday Celebration Volume 12 is a live album by Painkiller documenting their performance at Tonic in September 2003 as part of John Zorn's month-long 50th Birthday Celebration concert series.

Reception
The AllMusic review by Thom Jurek awarded the album 3½ stars stating "Zorn is out front playing snake-wise, melding everything from hard bop, free jazz, soul-oriented groove lines, and his own unclassifiable sonic palette. Patton's vocals are heavily treated yowls and screams combined with rhythmic breath work and moans. Tape delays are employed here as well, making the entire set a compelling, singular workout that is exciting, harsh, intense, and compelling."

Track listing

Personnel
John Zorn – alto saxophone 
Bill Laswell – bass
Hamid Drake – drums
Mike Patton – voice

References

Painkiller (band) albums
Albums produced by John Zorn
John Zorn live albums
2005 live albums
Tzadik Records live albums